Fred J. Woodward (April 26, 1882 – March 26, 1960) was a Canadian actor and animal impersonator during the silent film era who specialized in playing animal parts.

Biography
Woodward appeared in three films with the short-lived The Oz Film Manufacturing Company, all produced in 1914: The Patchwork Girl of Oz, The Magic Cloak of Oz and His Majesty, the Scarecrow of Oz. Before embarking on a film career Woodward appeared as a vaudeville actor with the Orpheum Circuit in roles portraying the "Teddy Bear" and the "Parrot". From 1909–1911 he played different animal parts with the Ziegfeld Follies including the "Ostrich", the "Jackass", the Frog, Stork and the Owl, and the G. O. P. Elephant. He later appeared at Weber & Fields in Roly Poly playing an alligator.

In 1913 Woodward moved to Los Angeles to appear in Oliver Morosco's musical play The Tik-Tok Man of Oz in which he played the role of Hank the Mule.

Woodward was born in Toronto in 1882 and died in Victoria on the Canadian West Coast in 1960 at an age of 77.

Filmography and roles
 The Patchwork Girl of Oz (1914) – The Woozy, a Quaintness / The Zoop, A Mystery / Mewel, who is Everybody's Friend
 The Magic Cloak of Oz (1914) – Nickodemus the Mule
 His Majesty, the Scarecrow of Oz (1914) – The Cowardly Lion / The Kangaroo / The Crow / The Cow / The Mule
 The Last Egyptian (1914) – Sebbet, the Embalmer
 Violet's Dreams (1915) (a set of four short films)
 A Box of Bandits
 The Country Circus – Circus Animals
 In Dreamy Jungletown
 The Magic Bon Bons
 Mule Mates (1917) – The Mule
 Like Babes in the Woods (1917) – Hank the Mule

External links

References 

1882 births
1960 deaths
Male actors from Toronto
Canadian male film actors
Canadian male silent film actors
Canadian expatriate male actors in the United States